Abida partioti  is a species of air-breathing land snail, a terrestrial pulmonate gastropod mollusc in the family Chondrinidae.

Geographic distribution
The native distribution of A. partioti is restricted to the central Pyrenees, in France and Spain.

Ecology 
A. partioti inhabits montane karstic areas, living within crevices or under stones, although in humid environments it can be found on the surface of limestone rocks and rubble.

See also 
List of non-marine molluscs of Metropolitan France
List of non-marine molluscs of Spain

References

External links
 

Chondrinidae
Gastropods of Europe
Gastropods described in 1848